This is a list of places of interest in the British county of Greater Manchester. See List of places in Greater Manchester for a list of settlements in Greater Manchester.

Bolton

Bury

Manchester

Oldham

Rochdale

Salford

Stockport

Tameside

Trafford

Wigan 

Greater Manchester
Greater Manchester